Abū Saʿīd Janibek Bahadur Khan bin Barak Sultan, otherwise known by his shortened regal name Janibek Khan, was a co-founder and second Khan of the Kazakh Khanate from 1473 to 1480. He was a son of Barak, Khan of the Golden Horde from 1422 to 1427. Barak Khan's father was Koirichak, grandson of Urus Khan, a direct descendant of Genghis Khan. Genghis Khan is Jochi Khan's father, Jochi Khan's son Tukai-Timur, Tukai-Timur's son Uz-Timur, Uz-Timur's son Khodja, Khodja's son Badakun-Uglan, Badakun-Uglan's son Urus Khan, Urus Khan's son Koirchak-khan, Koirchak-khan's son Barak Khan, and Barak Khan is Zhanibek/Janibek's father.

From his wife Jahan Begum Khanum, Janibek had nine sons: Qasim (who became his successor), Mahmud, Iranji, Ithik, Janysh, Qanabar, Tenish, Usuk, and Juak.  She also bore him two daughters, Suyimbike and Amanbike.    

Janibek Khan was a co-leader of a new Kazakh Khanate, following a successful rebellion against the Uzbek Khan Abu'l-Khayr Khan in 1465 and 1466. Janibek's father was Barak Khan, who was poisoned by the emirs of the former White Horde. He led the splinter group along with Kerei (or Girei or Kerei), his relative, who was also a descendant of the famous Urus Khan of the White Horde. For his wisdom, he was given the title "Az", meaning "the wise" in the Kazakh language, and so was called Az-Janibek. His son, Kasym Khan, codified the laws of his people.

Kazakh khans
Year of birth missing
Year of death missing